Samantha Stosur and Zhang Shuai defeated Coco Gauff and Caty McNally in the final, 6–3, 3–6, 6–3 to win the women's doubles title at the 2021 US Open. It was Stosur's fourth major title in women's doubles and eighth major overall, as well as Zhang's second major title; this was the team's second major title, following the 2019 Australian Open. This was the first major final for Gauff and for McNally.

Laura Siegemund and Vera Zvonareva were the reigning champions, but Siegemund did not participate due to injury. Zvonareva was scheduled to play partnering Jeļena Ostapenko, but Ostapenko withdrew from both the singles and doubles draws on the first day of the tournament.

Hsieh Su-wei regained the WTA No. 1 doubles ranking from her partner Elise Mertens after Barbora Krejčíková lost in the first round.

This was the final tournament for former WTA Finals finalist, 2014 French Open semifinalist and former doubles world No. 11 Carla Suárez Navarro. She partnered Sara Errani, but lost in the first round to Gauff and McNally.

Seeds

Draw

Finals

Top half

Section 1

Section 2

Bottom half

Section 3

Section 4

Other entry information

Wild cards

Protected ranking

Alternates

Withdrawals
Before the tournament
  Amanda Anisimova /  Anastasia Potapova → replaced by  Ulrikke Eikeri /  Elixane Lechemia
  Paula Badosa /  Sara Sorribes Tormo → replaced by  Kateryna Bondarenko /  Ankita Raina
  Anna Blinkova /  Heather Watson → replaced by  Zarina Diyas /  Varvara Gracheva
  Jeļena Ostapenko /  Vera Zvonareva → replaced by  Sara Errani /  Carla Suárez Navarro
  Anastasia Pavlyuchenkova  /  Elena Rybakina → replaced by  Emina Bektas /  Tara Moore

See also 
2021 US Open – Day-by-day summaries

References

External links
Main draw

Women's Doubles
US Open - Women's Doubles
US Open (tennis) by year – Women's doubles